Male Bille is a 2009 Indian Kannada-language film directed by K Mahesh Sukhadhare starring Diganth, Akshay, and Pragna in lead roles.

Cast

 Diganth as Akash
 Akshay  as Anand
 Pragna as Anjali
 Amogh 
 Ramakrishna
 Doddanna
 Komal
 Sharan
 Umesh
 Mandeep Roy

Music

Reception

Critical response 

R G Vijayasarathy of Rediff.com scored the film at 2 out of 5 stars and wrote "The real asset of the film is Manikanth Kadri's music. Two songs Chandamaama, Chandamaama and Nanage Ninna Muddisuvaase are well composed though the choreography is found lacking. The background music oscillates between good and ordinary. Suri's cinematographic work is above average". A critic from Deccan Herald wrote "Ramakrishna, Sangeetha and Doddanna are all well-placed. Hopefully, ‘Malebillhe’ will be the last such role for Digant.  Finally, rainbow is known as Kamanabillu or Malebillu in Kannada, not ‘Malebillhe’ or ‘Malebille’!" A critic from Bangalore Mirror wrote  "The background music is loud and hampers a decent sleep while watching the film. The camerawork is better than most other aspects of the film. Sukadhare’s break from filmmaking has not worked for him or the audience". A critic from Sify.com wrote  "There are two lovely songs scored by Manikanth Khadri. The doyen in Saxophone Khadri Gopalanath has lent a small tune in this film. The camerawork is the best part of the film".

References

2000s Kannada-language films
2009 films